The Night of Terror (German: Die Nacht des Schreckens) is a 1929 German silent film directed by Gennaro Righelli and starring Fritz Kortner, Renée Héribel and Alma Taylor. It was shot at the Staaken Studios in Berlin. The film's sets were designed by Gustav A. Knauer and Willy Schiller.

Cast
In alphabetical order
 Alex Bernard as Belajeff 
 William Freshman as Alexej 
 Renée Héribelas Marfa 
 Fritz Kortner as Prince Wagarin 
 Theodor Loos as Jegorow 
 Alma Taylor

References

Bibliography
 Klaus Volker. Fritz Kortner. Hentrich, 1987.

External links

1929 films
Films of the Weimar Republic
German silent feature films
Films directed by Gennaro Righelli
Films set in Russia
German black-and-white films
Films shot at Staaken Studios